Death Nurse is a 1987 slasher film written and directed by Nick Millard. It was followed by a 1988 sequel entitled Death Nurse 2.

Plot 

From their suburban home, Doctor Gordon Mortley and his sister Nurse Edith run Shady Palms Clinic, a facility that takes in physically or mentally ill indigents sent to them by the county. In reality, the Mortleys are con artists who murder their patients (usually during "surgeries" performed on them by Gordon) and continue billing the state for their care afterward. The only permanent resident of the clinic is the alcoholic Louise Kagel. One day, a social services worker, Faith Chandler, drops off John Davis, a man afflicted with tuberculosis. Edith smothers John, and Gordon buries his body, though he is later forced to dig it up and crudely puppeteer it to create the illusion that Davis is still alive when Faith asks to check in on him after bringing Charles Bedowski, who has a heart condition, to Shady Palms.

After Faith's visit, Edith and Gordon kill Bedowski while attempting to replace his heart with a dead dog's. The procedure is interrupted by the Mortley family cat, who grabs the heart. Gordon and Edith chase the cat, and deem the transplant a failure. Bedowski's remains are buried by Gordon, and Edith feeds pieces of him to the rats that live in the garage. The infestation of vermin does not go unnoticed by the authorities, and when Mr. Smith, an environmental health officer, threatens to shut the clinic down, Edith stabs him to death.

Faith herself checks into Shady Palms, and grows suspicious of the facility, which causes Edith to knife her, after feeding the woman rats she had cooked her for lunch. Louise witnesses Faith's murder, so Edith kills her with a syringe, despite Gordon's fondness for her. Edith has Gordon place the bodies of Smith, Faith, and Louise in the garage, from which their smell attracts the attention of a police lieutenant who had stopped by to visit Charles Bedowski. Observing from a window as the lieutenant opens the garage and discovers what is inside it, a dejected Edith sits on a sofa with Gordon, and the film ends.

Cast 

 Priscilla Alden as Nurse Edith Mortley
 Albert Eskinazi as Doctor Gordon Mortley
 Royal Farros as Mr. Powell/Charles Bedowski
 Frances Millard as Faith Chandler
 Irmgard Millard as Louise Kagel
 Nick Millard as John Davis
 Fred Sarra as Lieutenant Cal Bedowski

DVD release 

Slasher // Video released Death Nurse and its sequel on DVD in 2012. Limited to 1000 copies, the DVD includes features such as a Q&A with Nick Millard, and a commentary provided by him, Irmgard Millard, and Slasher // Video founder Jesus Terán.

Reception 

Rock! Shock! Pop!'s Ian Jane called the film "fascinatingly watchable" despite its horribleness, and wrote, "The acting is amateur hour in the best/worst way possible but say what you will, the movie is something. Exactly what, it's hard to say but as far as slashers go, this one ranks down there with the cheapest of the cheap, the worst of the worse. As such, it's easy to love if you're in the right frame of mind for it. You'd be foolish to take any of it seriously, it's obvious that those making the picture weren't". Slasherpool gave Death Nurse a 2 out of 5, finding some entertainment in Priscilla Alden's performance, the death scenes, and the film's ineptness and absurdity, concluding "The premise isn't a bad one... in fact, in more capable hands, this would make a pretty good black comedy... but you get what you get".

References

External links 

 

1987 films
Camcorder films
1987 horror films
American exploitation films
American serial killer films
Medical-themed films
American comedy horror films
1980s English-language films
Films about alcoholism
Films about con artists
Films about health care
Films shot in California
1987 direct-to-video films
American independent films
American black comedy films
Direct-to-video horror films
Films set in San Francisco
Films about nurses
1987 independent films
1980s American films